The Pick'n Pay Fast One, also called Hyper to Hyper is a single day  road cycling race held in South Africa.

Past winners

Men

References
 Results Pick'n Pay Fast One
 Results Hyper to Hyper

Cycle races in South Africa
Recurring events with year of establishment missing
Men's road bicycle races